The Moorish wars were a series of wars fought between the Byzantine Empire attempting to restore all of Roman North Africa, and the various Berber kingdoms and Nomads which formed after the collapse of Roman rule over the region. The war also featured other rebels such as the renegades of Stotzas and the Vandalic rebels of Guntarith. The war ended with the Berbers attempting to push the Romans out of Africa being defeated at the battle of the Fields of Cato, and the Byzantines being too weakened to take over the various newly formed kingdoms such as Altava and the Kingdom of the Aurès.

Sources 
The two sources for the Byzantine wars in North Africa of the 6th Century are Corippus and Procopius. Both are important primary sources. Procopius accompanied the Roman army during its campaigns and was directly in contact with Belisarius. Corippus was a Roman poet who witnessed the wars. Both give a relatively similar timeline of events in Africa. However, Corippus seems to have written a panegyric which wanted to praise the exploits of Jean Troglita and excuse for Byzantine policy in Africa. He thus minimizes Byzantine errors and assigns full responsibility for the Moorish war to Berber leaderAntalas, leading to bias.

Background 

Since the middle of the 5th century, the province of North Africa, were occupied by the Vandals. Nevertheless, a peace existed, since at least the Fall of the Western Roman Empire in 476, between the Eastern Roman Empire and the Vandals. However, The Emperor Justinian, had the great ambition to restore the Roman Empire in the West. North Africa was the first target before an invasion of Italy.

General Belisarius's expedition quickly and without much resistance defeated the Vandals whom were severely weakened by wars with the native Berber population. In 533, the capital Carthage was captured, less than a year after the expedition began. Justinian wanted to restore Roman Africa to the state it had been before the Vandal conquest, so the old provinces were restored with the only difference being that they now depended on the prefecture of Africa rather than that of Italy. The border was again fixed on the old limes. i.e. those before the conquest and Justinian announced that he wanted to expel all the "barbarian" peoples, that is to say the various Berber kingdoms and tribes which had formed through wars with the Vandals, or after the collapse of the Vandalic kingdom.

Mauri or Moor was the name given to the Berbers who inhabit North Africa from the Atlantic to the Syrtic range in Tripolitania and who lived in tribal structures.
 From the death of King Genseric in 477, the Moorish tribes had been a source of constant revolt for the Vandals. What had been "modest" Moorish communities grew into much larger and a more organized peoples. Several hypotheses are discussed to explain it today. This could have been due to an exodus of imperfectly Romanized peasants fleeing Vandal power, or nomadic groups from the Sahara. In 530, the chieftain Guenfan and his son Antalas inflicted defeat on the army of the vandal king Hilderic in Byzacena, in the Battle of Great Dorsale. The tribes were able to directly and permanently threaten the interior of the territory.

Each freshly established Byzantine province in Africa was threatened by various Berber peoples, but the main kingdoms and political entities included:

 The Kingdom of the Aurès led by king Iabdas (also known as Iaudas), whom became independent in 484 after defeating the Vandals
 The Kingdom of Altava led by king Masuna also known as the Mauro-Roman kingdom a Romanized Berber kingdom whom became independent in the 470s after Gaiseric's death and then rapidly expanded across western Algeria taking nearly all of the province of Mauretania Caesariensis except for the city of Ceaserea by 533
 The Kingdom of Hodna led by king Ortaias, situated in and outside the Hodna Mountains and ruling important cities such as Sitifis
 The Kingdom of Great Dorsale led by chieftain Guarizila was a kingdom established by the Frexenses tribe
 The Laguatan kingdom established by king Cabaon, threatening the Romans of Tripolitania.

During the Vandalic War, the Moors remained neutral and then submitted by declaring themselves "servants of the emperor" before Belisarius. This ritual practiced in the Vandal era seems to date back perhaps even to the High Empire. It is similar to Fœdus i.e. an alliance between Rome and a barbarian people defined by treaty. In exchange, the Moors received gifts and insignia of power from the Byzantines.

Pacification of Africa under Solomon and the First Moorish insurrection (534-543) 
General Solomon, the former lieutenant of Belisarius who was energetic, competent and courageous general, became the new governor. He faced a Moorish insurrection and a mutiny in an army led by Stotzas. The situation in Africa was so precarious that Justinian conceded to him the civil and military powers that were traditionally divided under the Roman administrative system since Diocletian. He became both magister militum and praetorian prefect.

Solomon was unable to enforce the Emperor's expulsion decrees. Shortly after his appointment, certain Moorish tribes, including those of Iaudas and Cusina, revolted and began to ravage the territory, no doubt inspired by the fact of Belisarius's departure. It seemed that the Romans did not have the same vision of the ritual of submission that the Moors concluded with Belisarius. For the Roman historian Procopius, the Moors did not revolt for no reason. Procopius had the same prejudice as other Romans of his time. The Moors were considered barbarians like anybody else who were not Greek or Roman. He didn't dwell on trying to understand them; they had no reason to revolt, because they had declared themselves slaves. For the Moors, this ritual nevertheless represented the recognition of their right to reside in the territories they occupied, also, the promise of food. There will be mention, by the Moors, in their negotiation with Rome, that they were mistreated by the Roman power despite past engagements with Belisarius.

In 536, the general's campaigns partially subdued the Moors. Pensions were paid to Moorish chiefs that resulted in them and their peoples not being expelled from their territories. Despite a decisive battle at Mount Bourgaon in 535, the Moorish forces remained relatively intact.

Roman infantry and heavy cavalry were not suited to a war waged against a semi-nomadic tribe equipped with very lightly armed troops. Roman troopers were equipped with bows, which led to a fear of direct confrontation. Moorish troops were able to wage guerrilla warfare and were able to retreat from large armed engagements without suffering too great a loss. The Moors essentially fought a war of ambush. The enemy were highly mobile and could hide and retreat to their home in the mountains and the desert. Only a persistent and skilful commander could permanently neutralize their forces.

Africa's well-equipped and trained Byzantine army was undisciplined, was quite small and lacked loyalty. Its troops were eager to loot and civilians complained of abuses by the soldiers. General Solomon was unpopular as he was considered too severe and therefore did not have the same respect as Belisarius in Africa. In 536, a plot to assassinate him in Carthage failed. The army mutinied and Solomon had to flee to Sicily. An army general, Germanus, a cousin of Justinian, was sent to restore order. Solomon didn't resume his duties until 539.

The outbreak of the Second Moorish insurrection 

Between 539 and 541, the governor Solomon built fortifications around the regions held by the Moors. The country seemed to have experienced real peace and prosperity according to the Roman poet Corippus. However, a diplomatic affront to Leptis Magna triggered a 2nd Moorish insurrection. Sergius, the nephew of Solomon and governor of Tripolitania, received a considerable delegation of Moorish leaders who complained about the plunder of their crops by the Romans. One of the leaders held the governor by the shoulders so that he could not withdraw.

The Moorish leaders were all murdered resulting in the Laguatans rising up and invading the region. The incident may not have just been due to the governor's incompetence and arrogance, but to the pressure exerted on the governor by local Roman elites. They wanted to keep the Moors away from their lands and homes. However, around the same time in 543, Solomon offended the chief Antalas. He had seen his pension cut off and learned that his brother had been killed by Solomon, for causing trouble. Rather than going directly up the road near the coast that goes up towards Byzacena and Carthage, the Laguatan join Antalas in the mountains of Byzacena near the Theveste-Carthage road. It was considered a strategic road, because it enabled communication between the Roman fortifications in the dorsals which protect the Roman cities in the plains near the coasts.

Procedure 
Solomon hurriedly set off to meet the revolted Moors from Theveste, on the Theveste-Carthage road. Taking his army through the forests, he finds himself in Cillium facing his enemy. The general may have intended to join his ally Cutzinas who lived in this territory or other Moorish allies. According to Corippus, he was accompanied by native contingents, but it is not known if Cutzinas, who had announced his help, had come to join him. According to Procopius, Solomon had the help of Sergius and other important Byzantine military contingents from Africa, but no native contingent is mentioned.

In the beginning, the balance of power between Romans and Moors is equal according to Procopius, but the Moors, soon outnumbered, rout most of the Byzantine army. The Byzantine troops had only reluctantly resolved to fight and some had refused. Solomon, surrounded by a small number of his guards, supports the attacks of the Berbers for some time. Finally, unable to resist any longer, he fled with his guards to the edge of a torrent which flowed near the battlefield. There, his horse falls into a ravine and the general is unable to fall back. Surrounded and overwhelmed, Solomon is captured and massacred by the Berbers with part of his bodyguards.

The Roman troops are defeated, partly because some soldiers had fled. This could be due to betrayal. Corippus attributes this to the soldiers' displeasure at not taking part in the looting of the previous battle. He also attributes the responsibility to the future rebel leader of Germanic origin, Guntharic, who was then dux of Numidia. Solomon, despite his leadership skills, has already provoked a mutiny under his command from Africa, because it was too harsh. According to Procopius' account, the Byzantines are defeated on a regular basis, and Guntharic's betrayal is not mentioned.

Consequences 
The defeat at Cillium plunged Africa into military anarchy until the arrival of John Troglita in 546. A great Moorish coalition was formed. Despite its potential to expel the Byzantines from Africa entirely, it could not succeed due to the lack of unity and common strategy among the Moors. Among the Romans, the death of Solomon left a military and political void that only the arrival of Jean Troglita would fill. In the short term, the tribes are content to plunder as far as possible, up to the walls of Carthage.

A Moorish grand coalition close to expelling the Byzantines from Africa 
The death of Solomon and his defeat had an impact as far as Spain, where the Visigoths took advantage of it to besiege Septimius beyond the Strait of Gibraltar. The tribes who had declared themselves faithful in Africa to Solomon, they will consider themselves released from their commitments and join the rebels, like Cutzinas.

The Moors can go up the Theveste-Carthage road, but are stuck in front of the fortress of Laribus. Briefly, they will succeed in taking the capital of Byzacena, Hadrumetum, by trickery before it falls again, by the same process, into Roman hands.

The Laguatan do not want to undertake long sieges and return to their countries in the fall in 544 and 545. It is essential for them to graze their herds during the rainy season in their country which extends November to early summer. The same scenario will repeat itself next year. The goal of these chiefs is not to establish themselves in the region, but simply to profit from the looting of the territory. Without their help, the first year, Antalas will send a first offer of submission to Rome, but which remains unanswered.

The goal of the Moors in the interior, on the contrary, is above all to place themselves in a better position of strength against the empire in the territories they occupy. Antalas does not seek to destroy Roman power and Roman cities as demonstrated by his attitude towards Roman civilization. Thus he spares Hadrumetum and its inhabitants after having taken it. He has been in contact for a very long time, like the other Moors in the interior, with Roman culture. In addition to wanting to defend the integrity of their territory inside Africa, they want the return of the traditional investiture ceremonies that Rome grants to barbarian peoples who accept submission and the Roman alliance, those that Belisarius had concluded with them. Antalas, however, will have more ambition when the balance of power is in its favor by wanting to create a Romano-Berber state like its neighbor by demanding from the governor to become king of Byzacena.

Apart from the divergence of strategic vision between the allies of the coalition, there is also the lack of unity between leaders and peoples. Past historians have seen a lack of "Moorish national spirit". Rivalries also separate the Moorish chiefs in their very original homes. Antalas and Cutzinas, both from Byzacena, for example, don't like each other. This is what will push Cutzinas to join Troglita later among others.

The political and military void left by Solomon's death 
Solomon's death at Cillium caused Justinian to appoint Sergius, who at the time was a civil and military governor of all of Africa. The measure was to honor Solomon and Sergius is hated by the Berbers due to the Leptis Magna massacre. The troops and the population see him only as an arrogant incompetent. Jean, the best officer in the army, did not cooperate with Sergius and the army remained impassive. A counter-attack was planned by Jean and the Duke of Byzacena called. However, his army was completely destroyed when John's messengers failed to reach him to inform him that the rallying point was already occupied by the enemy. A betrayal by Roman officers delivered the capital of Byzacena, Hadrumetum, to the Moors. Although it was taken over by the Romans thanks to a ruse by the local inhabitants, the Moorish leaders were now under the walls of Carthage and could plunder Africa as they pleased.

To remedy the situation, Areobindus is sent to share powers with Sergius, but the two men do not cooperate. At Thacia, Sergius left the army of Aerobindus alone against the Moors. This defeat convinced Justinian to recall the governor. Meanwhile, a mutiny by Guntharic overthrows Areobindus in Carthage. The new governor offers to share Africa with the Moors by giving Byzacena to Antalas. Guntharic is overthrown by Artabanes, an Armenian officer, but he prefers to return to Constantinople rather than assume the title of magister militum of Africa that Justinian grants him.

A political and military vacuum was therefore left by Solomon, which Sergius was unable to remedy due to his incompetence. The Roman army remained demoralized, relatively impassive and suffered from the betrayal of its leaders. Corippe mourned the plunder that Africa suffered at thar time and looked back with nostalgia to the time of Solomon. Only the arrival of Troglita could remedy the situation.

Restoration of Byzantine rule in Africa

Campaigns of John Troglita and the end of the Second Moorish insurrection (546–548) 
The 2nd Moor insurrection and military anarchy finally ended with the appointment of John Troglita, a capable and experienced general, to the post of magister militum of Africa. Upon his arrival at the end of 546, he launched a campaign to dislodge the looters of Byzacena. At the start of 547, he inflicted a great defeat, in the plains bordering the hills southeast of Hadrumetum at Antalas. The defeat of Cillium was avenged. The Moors retreated to the mountains in the interior and the captured regalia of Solomon was recovered. After this defeat, Antalas was only a minor member of the coalition and was replaced as leader of the coalition by Carcasan, a Moor from Tripolitania.

Jean Troglita already has experience as governor of an eastern province and he knew how to negotiate with the natives. It renewed the old foedus practiced under Belisarius. Only a few Moorish tribes in the interior were expelled. He reintegrated into the coalition, many Moorish leaders, including Cutzias. The long campaign against the insurgents was won with the support of Moorish leaders. Their number was considerable, the contemporary Corippus mentions 100,000.

The war takes on the aspect of an invasion and no longer incursions among the Moors of Tripolitania. They stayed in the fight even during the winter. Troglita entered their territory, too, not just to expel them, but to weaken them and reduce to nothing the great military danger they pose to Africa.

Troglita distinguished himself by his boldness during all the campaigns by penetrating deeply into Berber territories and not being discouraged by defeats.  A decisive defeat was inflicted, in the fields of Cato (548) on the Moorish tribes.

At the end of the campaign, Carcasan was killed by Troglita himself. As for Antalas, he submitted to Jean and is not mentioned again as a troublemaker.

Africa after Troglita 
Africa was now pacified and the danger from the Laguatan was averted. The Moorish tribes were subdued. Nevertheless, the army of Byzantine Africa had the same problems with discipline and insufficient numbers as before. In addition, it confined itself to a strict defensive function and did not reproduce campaigns like that of Troglita. Also, Byzantine Africa, suffering from a diplomatic policy that was not always coherent, as well as not having enough competent generals and governors, would still suffer from the same instability caused by the Moorish revolts. Thus, the governor, after John Troglita, will assassinate Cutzinas in 563 and claimed his pension. The governor did not respect the old modalities of the alliance between Romans and natives. Africa, covered with fortifications, and the Moors still disunited, will however hardly remain in the hands of the Byzantines until the Muslim conquest.

See also 
 Battle of Mammes
 Cutzinas
 Family tree of Byzantine emperors
 History of the Byzantine Empire

Literature

Citations

References

Bibliography

 
 
 
 
 Fentress Elizabeth and Wilson Andrew, "The Saharan Diaspora and the Southern Frontiers of Byzantine North Africa", in Conant, P., Jonathan, and Stevens T., Susan (eds), North Africa under Byzantium and Early Islam, Washington, Dumbarton Oaks Research Library and collection Trustees for Harvard University, 2016, 322p.
 Pringle, R. Denys, Sixth-century fortifications in Byzantine Africa vol.1, DPhil. University of Oxford, 1979, 346p.
 

Cillium
Cillium
Cillium
6th century in Africa
Byzantine North Africa
Berber history